Saltrup halt is a railway halt serving the village of Saltrup in North Zealand, Denmark.

Saltrup is located on the Gribskov Line from Hillerød to Gilleleje. The train services are operated by the railway company Lokaltog which runs frequent local train services between Hillerød station and Gilleleje station.

See also
 List of railway stations in Denmark
 Rail transport in Denmark

References

External links

 Lokaltog
 Gribskovbanen on jernbanen.dk

Railway stations in the Capital Region of Denmark
Buildings and structures in Gribskov Municipality